dogs is the first studio album by American post rock band Beware of Safety.  It was released in 2009.

Track listing
"Nu Metal" - 10:43
"The Supposed Common" - 8:02	
"Step Or Stone" - 5:29
"Hexa" - 7:34
"Circa" - 2:24
"Dogs" - 2:46
"Yards and Yards" - 9:13
"Light of Day" - 3:29
"The Laughter Died" - 10:16 
"Raingarden" - 7:39

Personnel
 Steve Molter - guitar
 Adam Kay - guitar
 Jeff Zemina - guitar
 Morgan Hendry - drums
 Patrick Murphy - Recording engineer, mixing
 Paul Pavao - Recording engineer (drums)
 Dave Collins - Mastering
 Shannon Dejongh - Violin, viola

Release details
 2009, US, The Mylene Sheath SHEATH011, release date 2009, CD

External links
 The Band's MySpace Page
 The Mylene Sheath
 ProgArchives

2009 debut albums
Beware of Safety albums